Fejzullahu is an Albanian surname. Notable people with the name include:

 Arbnor Fejzullahu (born 1993), Albanian footballer
 Ermal Fejzullahu (born 1988),  Albanian singer from Kosovo
 Erton Fejzullahu (born 1988), Swedish-Kosovar footballer of Albanian descent

Albanian-language surnames